The Avtozavodsky constituency (No.131) is a Russian legislative constituency in Nizhny Novgorod Oblast. Until 2007 the constituency covered Avtozavodsky, Leninsky and Sovetsky City Districts of Nizhny Novgorod. In 2016 Avtozavodsky constituency only retained Avtozavodsky City District but it took Pavlovo from former Dzerzhinsk constituency and Vyksa from former Arzamas constituency.

Members elected

Election Results

1993

|-
! colspan=2 style="background-color:#E9E9E9;text-align:left;vertical-align:top;" |Candidate
! style="background-color:#E9E9E9;text-align:left;vertical-align:top;" |Party
! style="background-color:#E9E9E9;text-align:right;" |Votes
! style="background-color:#E9E9E9;text-align:right;" |%
|-
|style="background-color:"|
|align=left|Aleksandr Tsapin
|align=left|Independent
|
|34.87%
|-
|style="background-color:"|
|align=left|Sergey Speransky
|align=left|Independent
|
|10.63%
|-
|style="background-color:"|
|align=left|Nikolay Ashin
|align=left|Independent
|
|9.12%
|-
|style="background-color:"|
|align=left|Tatyana Kuzmina
|align=left|Independent
|
|4.21%
|-
|style="background-color:#0085BE"|
|align=left|Yevgeny Zagryadsky
|align=left|Choice of Russia
|
|3.98%
|-
|style="background-color:"|
|align=left|Aleksey Svetlichny
|align=left|Independent
|
|3.23%
|-
|style="background-color:"|
|align=left|Vladimir Danilov
|align=left|Independent
|
|2.73%
|-
|style="background-color:"|
|align=left|Nikolay Ryabov
|align=left|Independent
|
|2.69%
|-
|style="background-color:"|
|align=left|Aleksandr Ivanov
|align=left|Yavlinsky–Boldyrev–Lukin
|
|2.46%
|-
|style="background-color:"|
|align=left|Anatoly Slyusarev
|align=left|Independent
|
|2.43%
|-
|style="background-color:"|
|align=left|Mikhail Dikin
|align=left|Independent
|
|2.37%
|-
|style="background-color:"|
|align=left|Gennady Gabov
|align=left|Independent
|
|1.00%
|-
|style="background-color:#019CDC"|
|align=left|Veniamin Lavrichev
|align=left|Party of Russian Unity and Accord
|
|0.65%
|-
|style="background-color:#000000"|
|colspan=2 |against all
|
|12.98%
|-
| colspan="5" style="background-color:#E9E9E9;"|
|- style="font-weight:bold"
| colspan="3" style="text-align:left;" | Total
| 
| 100%
|-
| colspan="5" style="background-color:#E9E9E9;"|
|- style="font-weight:bold"
| colspan="4" |Source:
|
|}

1995

|-
! colspan=2 style="background-color:#E9E9E9;text-align:left;vertical-align:top;" |Candidate
! style="background-color:#E9E9E9;text-align:left;vertical-align:top;" |Party
! style="background-color:#E9E9E9;text-align:right;" |Votes
! style="background-color:#E9E9E9;text-align:right;" |%
|-
|style="background-color:"|
|align=left|Pavel Vesyolkin
|align=left|Our Home – Russia
|
|38.81%
|-
|style="background-color:"|
|align=left|Nikolay Ryabov
|align=left|Communist Party
|
|10.04%
|-
|style="background-color:#1A1A1A"|
|align=left|Gennady Rumyantsev
|align=left|Stanislav Govorukhin Bloc
|
|6.47%
|-
|style="background-color:#2C299A"|
|align=left|Aleksey Svetlichny
|align=left|Congress of Russian Communities
|
|4.94%
|-
|style="background-color:"|
|align=left|Vyacheslav Cherkunov
|align=left|Independent
|
|3.81%
|-
|style="background-color:"|
|align=left|Vladimir Ivanov
|align=left|Independent
|
|3.81%
|-
|style="background-color:#D50000"|
|align=left|Viktor Mikhaylov
|align=left|Communists and Working Russia - for the Soviet Union
|
|3.70%
|-
|style="background-color:#959698"|
|align=left|Aleksey Vasilyev
|align=left|Derzhava
|
|3.44%
|-
|style="background-color:"|
|align=left|Lev Chirkov
|align=left|Liberal Democratic Party
|
|3.07%
|-
|style="background-color:#F5A222"|
|align=left|Yevgeny Gladkikh
|align=left|Interethnic Union
|
|2.44%
|-
|style="background-color:#000000"|
|colspan=2 |against all
|
|15.78%
|-
| colspan="5" style="background-color:#E9E9E9;"|
|- style="font-weight:bold"
| colspan="3" style="text-align:left;" | Total
| 
| 100%
|-
| colspan="5" style="background-color:#E9E9E9;"|
|- style="font-weight:bold"
| colspan="4" |Source:
|
|}

1999

|-
! colspan=2 style="background-color:#E9E9E9;text-align:left;vertical-align:top;" |Candidate
! style="background-color:#E9E9E9;text-align:left;vertical-align:top;" |Party
! style="background-color:#E9E9E9;text-align:right;" |Votes
! style="background-color:#E9E9E9;text-align:right;" |%
|-
|style="background-color:#1042A5"|
|align=left|Boris Nemtsov
|align=left|Union of Right Forces
|
|39.20%
|-
|style="background-color:"|
|align=left|Boris Vidyayev
|align=left|Independent
|
|37.98%
|-
|style="background-color:#FF4400"|
|align=left|Nadezhda Zakhtarenko
|align=left|Andrey Nikolayev and Svyatoslav Fyodorov Bloc
|
|5.52%
|-
|style="background-color:"|
|align=left|Mikhail Mirny
|align=left|Independent
|
|1.42%
|-
|style="background-color:"|
|align=left|Viktor Barinov
|align=left|Liberal Democratic Party
|
|1.17%
|-
|style="background-color:#FCCA19"|
|align=left|Vladimir Shubin
|align=left|Congress of Russian Communities-Yury Boldyrev Movement
|
|0.84%
|-
|style="background-color:"|
|align=left|Vladimir Prytkov
|align=left|Independent
|
|0.67%
|-
|style="background-color:"|
|align=left|Vladimir Chumak
|align=left|Independent
|
|0.59%
|-
|style="background-color:#084284"|
|align=left|Yury Krasavtsev
|align=left|Spiritual Heritage
|
|0.49%
|-
|style="background-color:#000000"|
|colspan=2 |against all
|
|10.56%
|-
| colspan="5" style="background-color:#E9E9E9;"|
|- style="font-weight:bold"
| colspan="3" style="text-align:left;" | Total
| 
| 100%
|-
| colspan="5" style="background-color:#E9E9E9;"|
|- style="font-weight:bold"
| colspan="4" |Source:
|
|}

2003

|-
! colspan=2 style="background-color:#E9E9E9;text-align:left;vertical-align:top;" |Candidate
! style="background-color:#E9E9E9;text-align:left;vertical-align:top;" |Party
! style="background-color:#E9E9E9;text-align:right;" |Votes
! style="background-color:#E9E9E9;text-align:right;" |%
|-
|style="background-color:"|
|align=left|Yury Sentyurin
|align=left|Rodina
|
|39.03%
|-
|style="background-color:"|
|align=left|Yury Lebedev
|align=left|Independent
|
|10.08%
|-
|style="background-color:"|
|align=left|Tatyana Kuzmina
|align=left|United Russia
|
|7.56%
|-
|style="background-color:"|
|align=left|Aleksandr Torkhov
|align=left|Communist Party
|
|6.50%
|-
|style="background-color:#14589F"|
|align=left|Dmitry Birman
|align=left|Development of Enterprise
|
|5.59%
|-
|style="background-color:"|
|align=left|Andrey Tarasov
|align=left|Independent
|
|5.54%
|-
|style="background-color:"|
|align=left|Vasily Pushkin
|align=left|Independent
|
|4.09%
|-
|style="background-color:"|
|align=left|Dmitry Bibikov
|align=left|Yabloko
|
|2.41%
|-
|style="background-color:"|
|align=left|Vladislav Kats
|align=left|Liberal Democratic Party
|
|1.54%
|-
|style="background-color:"|
|align=left|Viktor Chumak
|align=left|Independent
|
|1.28%
|-
|style="background-color:"|
|align=left|Sergey Vershinin
|align=left|Independent
|
|0.70%
|-
|style="background-color:"|
|align=left|Ilya Sarov
|align=left|Independent
|
|0.50%
|-
|style="background-color:#164C8C"|
|align=left|Yevgeny Berkov
|align=left|United Russian Party Rus'
|
|0.32%
|-
|style="background-color:#000000"|
|colspan=2 |against all
|
|13.64%
|-
| colspan="5" style="background-color:#E9E9E9;"|
|- style="font-weight:bold"
| colspan="3" style="text-align:left;" | Total
| 
| 100%
|-
| colspan="5" style="background-color:#E9E9E9;"|
|- style="font-weight:bold"
| colspan="4" |Source:
|
|}

2016

|-
! colspan=2 style="background-color:#E9E9E9;text-align:left;vertical-align:top;" |Candidate
! style="background-color:#E9E9E9;text-align:left;vertical-align:top;" |Party
! style="background-color:#E9E9E9;text-align:right;" |Votes
! style="background-color:#E9E9E9;text-align:right;" |%
|-
|style="background-color:"|
|align=left|Natalia Nazarova
|align=left|United Russia
|
|50.45%
|-
|style="background-color:"|
|align=left|Nikolay Ryabov
|align=left|Communist Party
|
|13.14%
|-
|style="background:"| 
|align=left|Aleksandr Razumovsky
|align=left|A Just Russia
|
|9.42%
|-
|style="background-color:"|
|align=left|Mikhail Shatilov
|align=left|Liberal Democratic Party
|
|7.65%
|-
|style="background:"| 
|align=left|Vyacheslav Burmistrov
|align=left|People's Freedom Party
|
|4.20%
|-
|style="background:"| 
|align=left|Aleksandr Kosovskikh
|align=left|Party of Growth
|
|2.11%
|-
|style="background-color:"|
|align=left|Vladimir Ponomarev
|align=left|Rodina
|
|2.10%
|-
|style="background:"| 
|align=left|Nazhia Fazulzhanova
|align=left|Communists of Russia
|
|2.05%
|-
|style="background:"| 
|align=left|Igor Goncharov
|align=left|Yabloko
|
|1.86%
|-
|style="background-color:"|
|align=left|Yevgeny Smirnov
|align=left|The Greens
|
|1.45%
|-
|style="background:#00A650"| 
|align=left|Ilya Pomeratsev
|align=left|Civilian Power
|
|0.89%
|-
| colspan="5" style="background-color:#E9E9E9;"|
|- style="font-weight:bold"
| colspan="3" style="text-align:left;" | Total
| 
| 100%
|-
| colspan="5" style="background-color:#E9E9E9;"|
|- style="font-weight:bold"
| colspan="4" |Source:
|
|}

2021

|-
! colspan=2 style="background-color:#E9E9E9;text-align:left;vertical-align:top;" |Candidate
! style="background-color:#E9E9E9;text-align:left;vertical-align:top;" |Party
! style="background-color:#E9E9E9;text-align:right;" |Votes
! style="background-color:#E9E9E9;text-align:right;" |%
|-
|style="background-color:"|
|align=left|Natalia Nazarova (incumbent)
|align=left|United Russia
|
|46.09%
|-
|style="background-color: " |
|align=left|Oleg Kiritsa
|align=left|Communist Party
|53,997
|21.31%
|-
|style="background-color: " |
|align=left|Inna Gorislavtseva
|align=left|A Just Russia — For Truth
|22,128
|8.73%
|-
|style="background-color: " |
|align=left|Aleksandr Sidelnikov
|align=left|Liberal Democratic Party
|14,165
|5.59%
|-
|style="background-color: " |
|align=left|Rustam Dostayev
|align=left|New People
|13,127
|5.18%
|-
|style="background-color: " |
|align=left|Sergey Timofeyev
|align=left|Party of Pensioners
|12,889
|5.09%
|-
|style="background-color: " |
|align=left|Maksim Petrov
|align=left|Rodina
|5,813
|2.29%
|-
|style="background-color: " |
|align=left|Yelena Shershakova
|align=left|Party of Growth
|4,039
|1.59%
|-
| colspan="5" style="background-color:#E9E9E9;"|
|- style="font-weight:bold"
| colspan="3" style="text-align:left;" | Total
| 253,341
| 100%
|-
| colspan="5" style="background-color:#E9E9E9;"|
|- style="font-weight:bold"
| colspan="4" |Source:
|
|}

Notes

References 

Russian legislative constituencies
Politics of Nizhny Novgorod Oblast